Mark Hawthorne may refer to:
Mark Hawthorne (footballer) (born 1973), Scottish former footballer
Mark Hawthorne (umpire) (born 1962), Irish cricket umpire
Mark Hawthorne (author) (born 1962), American writer and animal activist
Hate Man or Mark Hawhorne (1936–2017), American writer and philosopher